1201 Pennsylvania Avenue is a highrise skyscraper office building in Washington, D.C. on Pennsylvania Avenue. The building is 49 m (160 ft) tall and has approximately 13 floors. Its construction ended in 1981. It was designed by Skidmore, Owings & Merrill, LLP.

Current tenants include FiscalNote.

See also
List of tallest buildings in Washington, D.C.

References

External links

Skyscraper office buildings in Washington, D.C.
Skidmore, Owings & Merrill buildings
Office buildings completed in 1981
1981 establishments in Washington, D.C.